Mount Wood (sometimes referred to as Wood Peak) is the seventh-highest mountain in Canada and is located in Kluane National Park and Reserve. In 1900 it was named by the surveyor James J. McArthur (1856–1925) after Zachary Taylor Wood (d.1915), a North-West Mounted Police inspector in Dawson during the Klondike gold rush. He was later the commissioner of the NWMP.

See also

List of mountain peaks of North America
List of mountain peaks of Canada

References

External links

Wood
Saint Elias Mountains
Kluane National Park and Reserve